Vazhavallan is a village located in Thoothukudi district of the state Tamil Nadu, India. It is located in Srivaikundam taluk.  Korkaiyaan kaalvai, a stream cuts the village into two halves.

The people living here are mostly Hindu Nadars.

The Adhi Kilakathiyan swami temple, Parama Sakthi Amman  temple located here has rich ancient history. The chief god of Adhi Kilakathiyan Swami temple is said to be the last pandya king koon pandyan's son. Now the major work of people is agriculture. This village town was situated in the bank of Thamiraparani.

Vazhavallan is locally well known for a deep bore well which was built under the norms of Tamil Nadu Water Supply and Drainage Board, which supplies the Tamiraparani drinking water.

Schools 
 Government Higher Secondary School
panchayat union primary school

Temple
Adhi Kilakathiyan Swamy Temple
Muthumalai Amman Temple
Sriman Narayasamy Temple
Arunachi Amman Temple
Pudhusamy Temple

Language 
Tamil

Ancient name
SOUTH VALAVALLAN

River
tamirabarani

Villagers occupation
Farming AND FISHING AND BEST PLACE

References

Villages in Thoothukudi district